The men's 100 metres event at the 1985 Summer Universiade was held at the Kobe Universiade Memorial Stadium in Kobe on 29 and 30 August 1985.

Medalists

Results

Heats
Wind:Heat 3: -2.7 m/s, Heat 8: 0.0 m/s

Quarterfinals
Wind:Heat 1: -1.3 m/s, Heat 2: ? m/s, Heat 3: -1.0 m/s, Heat 4: 0.0 m/s

Semifinals
Wind:Heat 1: +7.7 m/s, Heat 2: -1.7 m/s

Final

Wind: 0.0 m/s

References

Athletics at the 1985 Summer Universiade
1985